This is a list of villages in Mant Tehsil in Mathura district of Uttar Pradesh, India.

{| class="wikitable sortable plainrowheaders"
|- style="text-align:center;"
! scope="col"|Sr.No.
! scope="col"|Village Name
! scope="col"|Population
! class="unsortable" scope="col"|Facts
|-
|1
|Abhaipura Banger
| 169
| small village
|-
|2
|Ahamadpur
| 1627
| 
|-
|3
|Akbarpur, Mathura
| 4419
| 
|-
|4
|Amanullapur
| 1,607
| 
|-
|5
|Amera
| 2,088
| 
|-
|6
|Arazi Milik Bikanushah
| 
|
|-
|7
|Arruwa Banger
| 12982
| Large Village
|-
|8
|Arruwa Khadar
| 71
| 
|-
|9
|Asfabad
| 386
| 
|-
|10
|Auhawa Bangar
| 3,398
| 
|-
|11
|Awa Khera
| 1,751
| 
|-
|12
|Badanpur
| 
| 
|-
|13
|Badhari
| 
| 
|-
|14
|Badoth
| 
| 
|-
|15
|Baghai Banger
|
| 
|-
|16
|Bahadin
|1,499
| 
|-
|17
|Baikunthpur
| 
| 
|-
|18
|Bakla
|
| 
|-
|19
|Balipur
| 2,088
| 
|-
|20
|Barhaun
| 2,088
| 
|-
|21
|Baroth Bangar
| 
| 
|-
|22
|Baroth Khadar
|
| 
|-
|23
|Basau Banger
| 
| 
|-
|24
|Begampur Banger
| 
| 
|-
|25
|Begampur Khader
| 
| 
|-
|26
|Bera, Mathura
| 2,923
| 
|-
|27
|Bhadanwara
| 
| 
|-
|28
|Bhadavan Banger
| 
| 
|-
|29
|Bhagat Bhakrelia Banger
| 
| 
|-
|30
|Bhairai Banger
|
| 
|-
|31
|Bhairai Khadar
| 
| 
|-
|32
|Bhalai
|
| 
|-
|33
|Bhankerpur Basela
| 2632
| Crime
|-
|34
|Bhartiyaka
|
| 
|-
|35
|Bheem Bangar
|
| 
|-
|36
|Bheema
| 2,088
| 
|-
37
Bhidauni
 3256 
 large Village
|-
|38
|Bhooda Sani
|
| 
|-
|39
|Bhudri
| 
| 
|-
|40
|Bhureka
| 
|
|-
|41
|Biballi
| 
| 
|-
|42
|Bijoli
|4,261
| 
|-
|43
|Bil Aliabad
|
| 
|-
|44
|Bilandpur
|
| 
|-
|45
|Bindu Bulaki
|
| 
|-
|46
|Birbal
|
| 
|-
|47
|Birhana
| 2,088
| 
|-
|48
|Birju Garhi
|
| 
|-
|49
|Bisavli
| 
| 
|-
|50
|Bulakpur
| 
| 
|-
|51
|Chandpur Kalan
|1790
| 
|-
|52
|Chandpur Khurd
|
| 
|-
|53
|Chhari
|
|known for Bhandirvan
|-
|53
|Chauhari
|
| 
|-
|54
|Chaukra
|
| 
|-
|55
|Chhinparai Banger
| 
| 
|-
|56
|Chindauli
|
| 
|-
|57
|Chinta Garhi
| 
| 
|-
|58
|Choorahansi
|
| 
|-
|59
|Dadisara
|
| 
|-
|60
|Daharuwa
|
| 
|-
|61
|Dangoli Bangar
|
| 
|-
|62
|Dangoli Khader
|
| 
|-
|63
|Daulatpur Banger
|
| 
|-
|64
|Daulatpur Khader
| 
| 
|-
|65
|Dilu Patti
| 2,616
| 
|-
|66
|Diwana
| 5,169
| 
|-
|67
|Dilu Patti
| 1,656
| 
|-
|68
|Dunetiya
| 866
| 
|-
|69
|Ekhu
| 1,798
| 
|-
|70
|Faridampur
| 
| 
|-
|71
|Firozpur
| 
| 
|-
|72
|Gaiyara
| 
| 
|-
|73
|Gaju
| 
| 
|-
|74
|Garhi Kolaher
| 
| 
|-
|76
|Girtana
| 
| 
|-
|77
|Gonga
| 
| 
|-
|78
|Hamazapur
| 
| 
|-
<td style= "background: blue; color: white; vertical align: centre;><td style= "background: blue; color: white; vertical align: centre;"></tr>
79
Harnaul
2455
known for HIDOLVAN

|80
|Girtana
| 
| 
|-
|81
|Inayatgarh Banger
| 
| 
|-
|82
|Inayatpur
| 
| 
|-
|83
|Iroli Gujar Bangar
| 
| 
|-
|84
|Irolizunnardar
| 
| 
|-
|85
|Jafarpur Banger
| 
| 
|-
|86
|Jahangirpur Banger
| 
| 
|-
|87
|Jaiswan
| 
| 
|-
|88
|Jarara
| 
| 
|-
|89
|Jatpura
| 
| 
|-
|90
|Javara
| 
| 
|-
|91
|Kakrari
| 
| 
|-
|92
|Kalyanpur
| 
| 
|-
|93
|Kaneka
| 
| 
|-
|94
|Kankar Garhi
| 
| 
|-
|95
|Karahari
| 
| 
|-
|96
|Khadiya
| 
| 
|-
|97
|Khaira
| 
| 
|-
|98
|Khajpur
| 
| 
|-
|99
|Khanpur
| 
| 
|-
|100
|Kharwal
| 
| 
|-
|101
|Kharwal
| 
| 
|-
|102
|Kheria
| 
| 
|-
|103
|Kinarai Bangar
| 
| 
|-
|104
|Kolahar
| 
| 
|-
|105
|Kolana Banger
| 
| 
|-
|106
|Koyal
| 
| 
|-
|107
|Kurawli
| 
| 
|-
|108
|Kudawara
| 
| 
|-
|109
|Lal Garhi
| 
| 
|-
|109
|Girtana
| 
| 
|-
|110
|Lalpur Mahavan
| 
| 
|-
|111
|Lalpur Mat
| 
| 
|-
|112
|Lamtauri
| 
| 
|-
|113
|Lohai
| 
| 
|-
|114
|Maduakar Banger
| 
| 
|-
|115
|Makhdumpur Banger
| 
| 
|-
|116
|Managarhi
| 
| 
|-
|117
|Mangal Khoh Banger
| 
| 
|-
|118
|Mani Garhi Bangar
| 
| 
|-
|119
|Manina Balu
| 
| 
|-
|120
|Maoli
| 
| 
|-
|121
|Marhalamukha Banger
| 
| 
|-
|122
|Mat Mula Bangar
| 
| 
|-
|123
|Mat Raja Bangar
| 
| 
|-
|124
|Meerpur Bangar
| 
| 
|-
|125
|Milik Kalan
| 
| 
|-
|126
|Mishri
| 
| 
|-
|127
|Mithauli
|3000
 
| 
|-
|128
|Moiuddinpur
| 
| 
|-
|129
|Mubarikpur
| 
| 
|-
|130
|Musmana Banger
| 
| 
|-
|131
|Nabipur
| 
| 
|-
|132
|Nagal
| 
| 
|-
|133
|Nagla Bari
| 
| 
|-
|134
|Nagla Birbala
| 
| 
|-
|135
|Nagla Dani
| 
| 
|-
|136
|Nagla Deh
| 
| 
|-
|137
|Nagla Himaun
| 
| 
|-
|138
|Nagla Jangali
| 
| 
|-
|139
|Nagla Mahru
| 
| 
|-
|140
|Nanakpur Banger
| 
| 
|-
|141
|Narbehansi
| 
| 
|-
|142
|Naseeti
| 
| 
|-
|143
|Nauhjheel Banger
| 
| 
|-
|144
|Nausherpur
| 
| 
|-
|145
|Nawali
| 
| 
|-
|146
|Neem Gaon
| 
| 
|-
|147
|Noorpur Banger
| 
| 
|-
|148
|Pabbipur
| 
| 
|-
|149
|Pach Hara
| 
| 
|-
|150
|Pal Kherha
| 
| 
|-
|151
|Panigaon Bangerl
| 
| 
|-
|152
|Panigaon Khader
| 
| 
|-
|153
|Parsauli
| 
| 
|-
|154
|Patipura
| 
| 
|-
|155
|Piproli Bangar
| 
| 
|-
|156
|Piri
| 
| 
|-
|157
|Pirsuwa
| 
| 
|-
|158
|Pithora Bangar
| 
| 
|-
|159
|Pokher Hirde
| 
| 
|-
|160
|Poluwa Kalan
| 
| 
|-
|161
|Raipur Banger
| 
| 
|-
|162
|Ram Nagla
| 
| 
|-
|163
|Ramgarhi Banger
| 
| 
|-
|164
|Sadarpur
| 
| 
|-
|165
|Saddikpur
| 
| 
|-
|166
|Saeo Patti Banger
| 
| 
|-
|167
|Said Garhi
| 
| 
|-
|168
|Sakatpur
| 
| 
|-
|169
|Salaka
| 
| 
|-
|170
|Samauli Bangaar
| 
| 
|-
|171
|Sampat Jogi
| 
| 
|-
|172
|Saur
| 
| 
|-
|173
|Shall
| 
| 
|-
|174
|Shankar Garhi
| 
| 
|-
|175
|Sherni
| 
| 
|-
|176
|Shivli
| 
| 
|-
|177
|Sigoni Banger
| 
| 
|-
|178
|Shihavan
| 309
| 
|-
|179
|Sikanderpur
| 
| 
|-
|180
|Sirrela
| 
| 
|-
|181
|Suhagpur
| 
| 
|-
|182
|Sultan Patti
| 
| 
|-
|183
|Sultanpur Bangar
| 
| 
|-
|184
|Suraj
| 2,285
| 
|-
|185 - 186
|Surir
| 47,185
| Surir Klan & Vijau
|-
|187
|Surja
| 618
| 
|-
|188
|Surraka
| 
| 
|-
|189
|Tehra Mahaban
| 1,446
| 
|-
|190
|Tehramat
| 618
| 
|-
|191
|Thainua
| 
| 
|-
|192
|Thana Amarsingh
| 903
| 
|-
|193
|Thok Bindavani
| 2,040
| 
|-
|194
|Thok Kamal
| 1,244
| 
|-
|195
|Thok Saru
|791
| 
|-
|196
|Thok Sumera
| 1,376
| 
|-
|197
|Thokgyan
| 1,561
| 
|-
|198
|Tilak Garhi
| 2,714
| 
|-
|199
|Tirwaya
| 1,433
| 
|-
|200
|Toli Banger
|844
| 
|-
|201
|Udhar
| 1,648
| 
|-
|}

Transportation
Mat is connected to Bajna - Mathura Road and  Yamuna Expressway.

See also

Mant (Assembly constituency)
Mathura district

References

Mant
Mant